Hillington East railway station is located in the Hillington district of Glasgow, Scotland, also serving the eastern portion of the large Hillington industrial estate (which is part of the town of Renfrew) to the north. The station is managed by ScotRail and is on the Inverclyde Line.

History 
The station opened on 19 March 1934 as Hillington. The station was renamed Hillington East on 1 April 1940.

Services
A few  trains call in the peaks and also in the evenings (once per hour each way after 18:30, as the Gourock service drops to hourly). On Sundays both Gourock and Wemyss Bay trains call here, giving a half-hourly frequency to/from Glasgow.

Footnotes

References 

Butt, R. V. J. (1995). The Directory of Railway Stations. Patrick Stephens Ltd, Sparkford, .

External links 

Railway stations in Glasgow
Former London, Midland and Scottish Railway stations
Railway stations in Great Britain opened in 1934
SPT railway stations
Railway stations served by ScotRail